Clouds is an album by Sonic Youth guitarist/vocalist Lee Ranaldo. The album is a reworked recording of the concert performed by Ranaldo & William Hooker at the 1997 edition of the Festival International de Musique Actuelle de Victoriaville.

Track listing 
"Vast Beings" - 5:57
"25 Views Of Florence" - 13:32
"New Thought Life" - 3:52
"Trees Lie Cut" - 6:41
"Junkyard Language" - 3:05
"No Apples Fell" - 7:44
"Train Wreck" - 5:42
"Nothing Was Revealed" - 6:19
"Cloud Nine" - 5:21

References

1997 albums
Lee Ranaldo albums